Scottsboro City Schools is a public school district in Scottsboro, Alabama.

In the Scottsboro City School system, there are about 2,450 students, divided among five different schools, as well as an alternative school. Each school has its own mascot, such as the Brownwood Beaver. However, the Scottsboro Wildcat is the one mascot the whole city shares.

Schools
Nelson Elementary (Pre-K and K)
Caldwell Elementary (1st–3rd)
Collins Intermediate (4th–6th)
Scottsboro Junior High School (7th–8th)
Scottsboro High School (9th–12th)

Former schools
Brownwood Elementary – Closed May 2018

See also
Jackson County School District

References

Education in Jackson County, Alabama
School districts in Alabama